= Milak Imamnagar =

Coordinates: 28°34′N 79°27′E

Milak Imamnagar, also known Gautia, is a small village located in the west of Uttar Pradesh, India. The village consists of one primary and one junior high school which are attended by 500 children from the village and from other nearby villages. The head of the village is Shri Jaswant Singh who is also the former member of Zila Panchayat. The village population, including children, is around 1000.
